Soul is an album by pianist Ray Bryant released on Sue Records in 1965.

Reception 

The Allmusic review stated "Ray Bryant is a master of soul-jazz but these 1964 studio recordings are a bit of a disappointment. ... Bryant leans a bit too heavily toward rhythm & blues, while his music might have been more interesting heard as piano solos. A piano of questionable tuning and muddy sound hardly helps matters. ... Most fans of Ray Bryant can safely bypass this release".

Track listing 
All compositions by Ray Bryant except where noted
 "I Miss You So" (Bertha Scott, Jimmie Henderson, Sid Robin) – 3:24
 "I Almost Lost My Mind]]" (Ivory Joe Hunter) – 4:17
 "Since I Fell For You"  (Buddy Johnson) – 2:55
 "They All Say I'm The Biggest Fool"  (Johnson) – 2:37
 "Gospel Bird" – 4:25
 "Little Suzie '65" – 2:29
 "Lonely Avenue" (Doc Pomus, Ray Charles) – 3:30
 "Please Send Me Someone to Love" (Percy Mayfield) – 3:40
 "Stick With It" – 4:03
 "I Don't Care Who Knows" (Johnson) – 3:49
 "Goldfinger" (John Barry, Leslie Bricusse, Anthony Newley) – 2:40
 "Adalia" – 2:48

Personnel 
Ray Bryant – piano
Wally Richardson – guitar (tracks 3, 5, 7 & 9)
Tommy Bryant – bass
Sonny Brown (tracks 6, 11 & 12), Walter Perkins (tracks 1–5 & 7–10) – drums

References 

1965 albums
Ray Bryant albums
Sue Records albums